Frank Walsh (1897–1968) was the Premier of South Australia.

Frank or Francis Walsh may also refer to:

Frank Walsh (golfer) (1902–1992), American professional golfer
Frank Walsh (rugby union) (born 1976), Canadian rugby union prop
Frank B. Walsh (1895–1978), Canadian-American ophthalmologist
Frank P. Walsh (1864–1939), American attorney and labor expert
Frank S. Walsh (born 1953), British neuroscientist
Francis Leigh Walsh (1789–1884), Canadian political figure
Frank Walsh (baseball umpire) (1905–1985), American baseball umpire

See also
Francis Walsh (disambiguation)
Frank Walshe (1904–1962), Australian rules footballer
Francis Walshe (1885–1973), British neurologist
Fran Walsh (born 1959), female screenwriter